The Applied Inorganic Chemistry Award, established in 2008, is conferred biennially by the Dalton division of the Royal Society of Chemistry for "outstanding contributions to the development of any branch of inorganic chemistry which has an application in industry." The winner gives a lecture tour in the UK, and receives a medal and £2000.

Winners
Source:

See also

 List of chemistry awards

References

Awards of the Royal Society of Chemistry
Inorganic chemistry